William Ernest Goodman (December 10, 1838 – March 22, 1912) was an American soldier who fought in the American Civil War. Goodman received his country's highest award for bravery during combat, the Medal of Honor. Goodman's medal was won when he rescued the colors of the 107th Ohio Infantry from Confederate States Army forces during the Battle of Chancellorsville, in Virginia on March 3, 1863. He was honored with the award on January 11, 1894.

Goodman was born in Philadelphia. He was commissioned as an officer in September 1861, and mustered out with his regiment in July 1865. Goodman was buried in Whitemarsh, Pennsylvania.

Medal of Honor citation

See also
List of American Civil War Medal of Honor recipients: G–L

References

1838 births
1912 deaths
American Civil War recipients of the Medal of Honor
People from Montgomery County, Pennsylvania
People of Pennsylvania in the American Civil War
Union Army officers
United States Army Medal of Honor recipients